Echinicola sediminis  is a Gram-negative, rod-shaped and aerobic bacterium from the genus of Echinicola which has been isolated from beach sediments from the Yellow Sea from Sindu-ri in Korea.

References

External links
Type strain of Echinicola sediminis at BacDive -  the Bacterial Diversity Metadatabase

Cytophagia
Bacteria described in 2017